Tiger Tyson is an American actor in gay pornographic films.

Awards and nominations

Bibliography

See also
 List of actors in gay pornographic films

References

External links
 

American male pornographic film actors
Living people
Gay men
Year of birth missing (living people)